The Makahiki season is the ancient Hawaiian New Year festival, in honor of the god Lono of the Hawaiian religion.

It is a holiday covering four consecutive lunar months, approximately from October or November through February or March. The focus of this season was a time for men, women and chiefs to rest, strengthen the body, and have great feasts of commemoration (ʻahaʻaina hoʻomanaʻo). During Makahiki season labor was prohibited and there were days for resting and feasting. The Hawaiians gave thanks to the god Lonoikamakahiki for his care. He brought life, blessings, peace and victory to the land. They also prayed to the gods for the death of their enemies. Makaʻainana (commoners) prayed that lands of their aliʻi (chief) may be increased, and that their own physical health along with the health of their chiefs be  at the fullest.

In antiquity, many religious ceremonies occurred during this period. Commoners stopped work, made offerings to the chief or alii, and then spent their time practicing sports, feasting, dancing and renewing communal bonds. During the four lunar months of the Makahiki season warfare was forbidden which was used as "a ritually inscribed means to assure that nothing would adversely affect the new crops."

Today, the Aloha Festivals (originally Aloha Week) celebrate the Makahiki tradition.

Festivities

The Makahiki festival was celebrated in three phases. The first phase was a time of spiritual cleansing and making hookupu, offerings to the gods. The Konohiki, a class of chiefs that managed land, provided the service of tax collector, collected agricultural and aquacultural products such as pigs, taro, sweet potatoes, dry fish, kapa and mats. Some offerings were in the form of forest products such as feathers. The Hawaiian people had no money or other similar medium of exchange. These were offered on the altars of Lono at heiau (temples) in each district around the island. Offerings were also made at the ahu, stone altars set up at the boundary lines of each community.

All war was outlawed to allow unimpeded passage of the image of Lono. The festival proceeded in a clockwise circle around the island as the image of Lono (Akua Loa, a long pole with a strip of tapa and other embellishments attached) was carried by the priests. At each ahupuaa (each community also is called an ahupuaa) the caretakers of that community presented hookupu to the image of Lono, a fertility god who caused things to grow and who gave plenty and prosperity to the islands. The Akua Loa was adorned with white kapa streamers and the king placed a niho palaoa necklace on the deity. During a certain time the deities couldn't be upright therefore were laid down or put horizontally as a “sign of homage to the king."

The second phase was a time of celebration: of hula dancing, of sports (boxing, wrestling, sliding on sleds, javelin marksmanship, bowling, surfing, canoe races, relays, and swimming), of singing and of feasting. Some of these games that were played were physical sports. Other games were played for your mind. However, not only were the contestants being judged but their family name was also on the line. One of the best preserved lava sled courses is the Keauhou Holua National Historic Landmark. The Kanaka Maoli were also passionate about the games for their mind. These games consisted of riddles, recitation of genealogies, proverbs, and knowledge of hidden meanings. Our ancestors cherished these games and held them dear to their naʻau. They also placed bets on a favorite champion, which was a common practice in traditional times. Some daring to bet their lives as well. Makahiki games are still practiced today by many organizations and enrichment programs for the younger generation to learn about their ancestors.

In the third phase, the waa auhau — tax canoe — was loaded with hookupu and taken out to sea where it was set adrift as a gift to Lono. At the end of the Makahiki festival, the chief would go off shore in a canoe. When he came back in he stepped on shore and a group of warriors threw spears at him. He had to deflect or parry the spears to prove his worthiness to continue to rule.

Arrivals during the season

A royal birth during the season was sometimes given the name Lono i ka makahiki.

The sails and masts of Captain James Cook's ship resembled Lono's Akua Loa. Captain Cook arrived at Kealakekua Bay, near a large heiau to Lono during the Makahiki season in 1778.

Origin

The ancient Hawaiians split the year into two seasons. The first was called the Makahiki season which was a period of four lunar months. The second lasted eight lunar months where rituals of Kū were practiced. In the Hawaiian language, the word Makahiki means "year" as well as the change from harvest time to the beginning of the agricultural season. This probably came from Makalii hiki, the rising of the Pleiades, known in Hawaii as Makaliʻi, which occurred about this time. It might also come from ma Kahiki, meaning roughly "as in Tahiti", since the legend of Lono is associated with voyages to and from Tahiti. Its origins are linked to the "return" of Lono, during one of the early migrations, in the form of a mortal man.

Timing

The beginning of Makahiki generally is fixed each year by astronomical observations. On the Island of Hawaiʻi, when Makaliʻi (Pleiades) star cluster rises shortly after sunset, usually on November 17, the rising of the following first crescent moon marks the beginning of the season. On Oʻahu, it may begin when Makaliʻi rises above Puʻu o Mahuka Heiau, as seen from Kaena Point, or when the star ʻAʻa (Sirius) appears in conjunction with a particular land form high on a cliff.

See also
 Matariki
 Native Hawaiian cuisine

References

Further reading
 Handy, E. S. C. Ancient Hawaiian Civilization. Honolulu, HI: Mutual Publishing, 1999.
 Handy, Edward Smith Craighill; Handy, Elizabeth Green; Pukui, Mary Kawena Native Planters in Old Hawaii: Their Life, Lore, and Environment. Honolulu: Bishop Museum Press, 1972 (rev. ed. 1991). 
"The Rebirth of Makahiki" Article about past and current Makahiki activities. Maui No Ka 'Oi Magazine Vol.10 No.4 (September 2006)
"Makahiki - The Hawaiian New Year" On-line article on Makahiki traditions.

External links

Photos of various aspects of Makahiki on Wikipedia Commons

Hawaiiana
Hawaiian religion
New Year celebrations
Festivals in Hawaii
Religious festivals in the United States